The 1997 season was the 85th year of competitive soccer in the United States.

National team

Record

Results
The home team or the team that is designated as the home team is listed in the left column; the away team is

in the right column.

Goalscorers

Unofficial Results
The home team or the team that is designated as the home team is listed in the left column; the away team is in the right column.

League tables

Men

Major League Soccer 

Playoffs

Best of Three series winners will advance.

MLS Cup

A-League 

Northeast Division

Atlantic Division

Central Division

Pacific Division

Lamar Hunt U.S. Open Cup

Bracket
Home teams listed on top of bracket

Final

American clubs in international competitions

Los Angeles Galaxy

D.C. United

Seattle Sounders

References
 American competitions at RSSSF
 American national team matches at RSSSF
 CONCACAF Champions' Cup at RSSSF

 
1997